A nurse registry, nursing registry, or register of nurses is a list of nurses who are legally licensed to practice nursing.  The register is maintained by the licensing body designated by law to regulate the profession.  This is the source of the legal title "Registered Nurse".  Usually each nurse is issued a unique identification or license number.

In the United States, the term nurse registry is also commonly used to refer to a nursing agency, a private business which provides per diem or locum tenens nursing personnel to hospitals, medical offices and individuals.

Nurse registries are also companies who provide referrals to patients for skilled and unskilled nursing care.  These companies maintain lists of nursing personnel, whom they ensure have the proper licensing and training, that they use to refer nurses acting as independent contractors to patients.

Florence Nightingale opposed a single, nationalalized registry of nurses. She notes that a single nationalized register would quickly go out of date, harming newly-trained nurses and lending legitimacy to trained nurses who later proved ill-equipped for the job. At the time, the length and quality of training varied widely. The register proposed by the British Nurses' Association did not list any details of the training a nurse had received. Nightingale believed nursing should be autonomous as a profession, rather than under the control of physicians. Half of the BNA's seats were to be given to doctors. Nightingale led several campaigns against the BNA.

See also

 Board of nursing
 Nursing
 Registered nurse

Citations 

Registry